"Laura non c'è" ("Laura Is Not Here") is a pop-rock song written by Italian pop singer Nek. It was released as the second single from his fourth album Lei, gli amici e tutto il resto (1997) and achieved a huge success in Italy, Europe and Latin America. The song was sung by Nek in the Sanremo Music Festival in 1997. Other versions include "Laura is Away", in English, and "Laura no está", in Spanish.

Track listing

Other versions
In Spain and Latin America, a Spanish language version of the song, "Laura no está", was released. An English version of the song, "Laura is away", was also released in the United Kingdom, the song managed to reach number-fifty-nine in the UK Singles Chart. More recently, a French version was released in Italian/French with the French singer Céréna.
A Spanish language version of the song called "Laura no esta" charted in the US as it peaked at no. 21 in the Billboard Hot Latin Songs Chart in the week of 23 May 1998. In 1999 a Greek version was released called σκέψου καλά (skepsou Kala) by the Greek singer Nectarios Sfirakis. The Belgian singer Wim Soutaer released the single, Voor Altijd in 2004, which was a Dutch version with different lyrics.

Charts

Year-end charts

Certification

References

1997 singles
Italian-language songs
Spanish-language songs
English-language Italian songs
French-language songs
Nek songs
Sanremo Music Festival songs
Songs written by Nek